Eric L. Berlow is an American ecologist and data scientist. He co-founded Vibrant Data Inc., a data interface company, which was acquired by Rakuten Inc. in 2016.  Prior to Vibrant Data, Berlow was the founding director of the University of California's first science and education institute inside Yosemite National Park which facilitated efforts to leverage data for informing conservation policy and natural resource management. Berlow is internationally recognized for his research on ecological complexity, with articles in Nature, Science, and Proceedings of the National Academy of Sciences. He is best known for his TED talks on simplifying complexity and finding hidden patterns in complex data.  Berlow has received a TED Fellowship, a TED Senior Fellowship, an Alexander Von Humboldt Fellowship, a National Science Foundation Post-doctoral Fellowship, and a National Center for Ecological Analysis and Synthesis Fellowship.  He was named one of the top 100 Creatives by Origin magazine.

Education
Berlow completed his undergraduate studies at Brown University in 1984, earning a B.A. degree in biology. He received a Doctor of Philosophy degree from Oregon State University in 1995 in marine ecology with a thesis on ecological complexity, supervised by Jane Lubchenco and Bruce A. Menge.  He was a National Science Foundation Postdoctoral Fellow at the University of California at Berkeley working with Carla D'Antonio on the ecology of mountain ecosystems in the Sierra Nevada.

Career
Berlow's research career has focused on ecology, food webs, and networks. He was the founding director of the University of California Sierra Nevada Research Station in Yosemite National Park.  Examples of his highly cited network ecology publications include a 2009 paper in PNAS for which he was the lead author focused on predicting interaction strengths in food webs, a 1999 paper in Nature on "Strong effects of weak interactions in ecological communities", and a 1994 paper in Ecological Monographs on the keystone species concept.   He co-authored a paper that was among the top twenty most cited papers  in Environment and Ecology from 1998-2008 entitled "Biodiversity - global biodiversity scenarios for the year 2100".  Berlow has also contributed to conservation through his work on alpine meadows and threatened amphibians.

In 2013 Berlow co-founded Vibrant Data Inc., a cloud-based data analytics platform for analyzing complex relationships.  As a speaker at the TED Conferences, Berlow has given three presentations on topics including Simplifying Complexity, Mapping Ideas Worth Spreading, and The Ecological Structure of Collaboration.

References

External links
 
 

Living people
Year of birth missing (living people)